Ishibashi Ningetsu (石橋 忍月, 1 September 1865 – 1 February 1926) was a Japanese author and literature critic. His critique "Maihime", on the short story of the same name by Mori Ōgai, was an important dispute in literature during the early Meiji period. He was also among the contributors of Jogaku zasshi, an influential magazine of the Meiji era.

Major works
 Zaika Ron (罪過論, 1890)
 Maihime (舞姫, 1890)

See also 
 Japanese literature
 List of Japanese authors

References

External links
  His works in Aozora Bunko

1865 births
1926 deaths
Japanese writers
Writers from Fukuoka Prefecture